Meleparambil Anveedu is a 1993 Indian Malayalam-language romantic comedy-drama film directed by Rajasenan and scripted by Raghunath Paleri from a story by Gireesh Puthenchery. The film stars Jayaram and Shobana, with Narendra Prasad, Meena Joseph, Jagathy Sreekumar, Janardanan, Vijayaraghavan, Oduvil Unnikrishnan, and Vinu Chakravarthy in supporting roles. The film was produced and distributed by Mani C. Kappan. This film is considered as the one of the best comedy movies in Malayalam cinema and has a cult status. It was remade in Tamil twice, as Valli Vara Pora (1995) and Naiyaandi (2013). Kappan remade the film in Assamese as Borolar Ghor (2012).

Plot 
Harikrishan is the youngest son of Thiruvikraman Muthallali. His brothers Jayakrishnan and Gopikrishan are uneducated and unmarried. He wants to earn a good living and so sets forth to a Tamil village as manager of a courier company. Hari sees a young Tamil woman named Pavizham who is the daughter of a landlord Pollachi Gounder; the landlord initially is fond of Harikrishnan, but Pavizham's cousin Marimuthu hates him.  Pavizham and Harikrishnan get to know one another. The two fall in love, but her father desires another groom and potentially her cousin Marimuthu and when her father forces her to marry against her will, they elope. But they were caught and presented before naattukoottam (panchayat) presided over by Pavizham's father, since he is considered the "nattamai" of the village. Finally, out of his love for his daughter, Gounder issues a "theerpu" and presents a thaali (wedding knot) for Harikrishnan to tie around Pavizham's neck as a finalization of marriage between the two.

Hari is afraid of whether or not his parents would agree to their marriage, so he keeps Pavizham undercover as a maid in his home. When Hari goes away on business, his parents realize that Pavizham is pregnant and decide to dismiss her from her job. When Hari returns home, he is forced to reveal that Pavizham is his wife. Hari's mother, who likes Pavizham, scolds Hari for keeping his wife as a servant — she and her husband express their willingness to accept Pavizham as their daughter-in-law.

Cast 

Jayaram as Harikrishnan Pillai
Shobana as Pavizham
Narendra Prasad as Thiruvikraman Pillai
Meena Joseph as Bhanumathi Pillai
Jagathy Sreekumar as Jayakrishnan Pillai
Vijayaraghavan as Gopikrishnan Pillai
Janardanan as Kannappan
Paravoor Bharathan as Paramasivan
Oduvil Unnikrishnan as Kuttan Nair
Vinu Chakravarthy as Veeramuthu Gounder, Pavizham's father.
Vijayachandrika as Veeramuthu Gounder's wife, Pavizham's mother
Rani Larius as prospected bride during pennukanal (Younger Sister)
Crane Manohar as a lorry driver
Uzhavoor Vijayan as Agriculture Department Officer
Ram Lakshman (stunt choreographers) (climax fight scene)

Other crew 
 Art: Valsan
 Makeup: Karumam Mohan
 Costumes: Indrans
 Choreography: Madhuri
 Stunts: Malaysia Bhaskar
 Advertisement: Sabu Colonia
 Lab: Prasad Colour Lab
 Stills: Surya Peter
 Effects: Murukesh
 P. R. O.: Abraham Lincoln, Vazhoor Jose
 Production Controller: Gireesh Vaikom
 Outdoor: Sreemovies
 Titles: Ganga Thalaivi

Production

Development 
After the success of Jayaram and Rajasenan Ayalathe Adyeham (1992), they planned to do another family entertainer. At this time, lyricist Gireesh Puthenchery told Jayaram a story about four bachelors with the youngest the only one educated, in a Corleone-like family. Jayaram, who was highly inspired by this story, decided to produce it himself. The thread developed by Puthenchery and introduced to Rajasenan. It was first developed into a novel and then into a complete film script. Jayaram suggested Goodknight Mohan distribute it. However, Mohan set an unusual demand to Rajasenan, to include some experienced directors to supervise him on script. This was unacceptable to Rajasenan and the project was shelved. At this time, Rajasenan was replaced from the crew of a political film, Janam, produced by Mani. C. Kappan. Kappan assured Rajasenan to produce a film for him, as a compensation for his move. The shelved story of Meleparambil Aanveedu was returned by Mohan, for an amount of 20,000. Calicut-based film writer Raghunath Paleri was selected to write the screenplay. Gireesh initially told the story to director Shaji Kailas, who turned down since he was interested in action films at that time, but offered to direct it some other time. Later, Kailas invited producer Goodknight Mohan to the film and after Gireesh briefed the story, Mohan immediately gave an advance of 10,000.

Casting 
The originally decided cast included obviously Jayaram, along with Shobhana, Meena, Jagathy Sreekumar, Oduvil Unnikrishnan etc. Vijayaraghavan was later signed in to do the mostly serious character in the film. Narendra Prasad, who was typecast for villain roles, was later selected. Innocent was originally cast for the role done by Janardhanan. He rejected the role as he was busy with another film, Sakshal Sreeman Chathunni. Janardhanan, widely known for his villain roles was thus selected to do that comedy role. The others in the cast are Vinu Chakravarthy, Priyanka etc.

Filming 
The film was initially set in Salem in the script and was to be shot there, too.  However, a practical change was made to replace Salem with Pollachi, both in the script as well as the filming location.

Box office 
The film was a commercial success and ran more than 200 days.

Soundtrack 
The soundtrack for the film is composed by Johnson Master and lyrics penned by Girish Puthenchery, I.S. Kundoor and Kavinjar Kaalidasan. It proved popular upon release.

Remakes 
Meleparambil Anveedu was remade in Tamil twice, as Valli Vara Pora (1995) and Naiyaandi (2013). In August 2012 the producer of Meleparambil Anveedu, Mani C. Kappan announced to remake the film in Assamese in a press conference held in Guwahati. Kappan himself produced and directed the film, titled Borolar Ghor (2012) under the banner of Okay Productions.

References

External links 
 
 

1990s Malayalam-language films
1993 romantic comedy films
Films scored by Johnson
1993 films
Malayalam films remade in other languages
Films directed by Rajasenan
Indian romantic comedy films